Theodora, Slave Empress is a 1954 film about Theodora, a former slave who married Justinian I, emperor of Byzantium in AD 527–565. It was directed by Riccardo Freda.

Cast
Gianna Maria Canale as "Theodora"
Georges Marchal as "Justinian I"
Renato Baldini as "Arcal", Theodora's would-be lover
Henri Guisol as "Giovanni di Cappadocia"
Irene Papas as "Faida", Theodora's step-sister
Olga Solbelli as "Egina", Theodora's step-mother
Roger Pigaut as "Captain Andres"
Nerio Bernardi as "General Belisarius"
Carletto Sposito as "Scarpios"
Alessandro Fersen as "The Metropolitan"

Release
Theodora, Slave Empress was distributed theatrically in Italy on 29 September 1954 by Lux Film. It grossed a total of 592 million Italian lire on this domestic release.

It was also distributed in France by Lux Compagnie Cinématographique de France as Théodora, impératrice de Byzance. The film was the first of director Riccardo Freda's film to obtain a wide distribution outside Italy.

It was also released in the USA in December, 1954, distributed by Lux Film America as an I.F.E. release.  For this occasion, the film was dubbed into English and edited to 88 minutes (from its original runtime of 124 minutes).  The editing was accomplished by simply removing the middle 4 reels of film, covering the plotline from the marriage of Theodora and Justinian to the start of the nobility's revolt against Justinian and his reforms.

Reception
In a contemporary review, The Monthly Film Bulletin spoke of the film in negative terms, calling it a "dispiriting experience". The piece referred to Freda's direction as "laboured", stating that he "brings neither gusto nor honest vulgarity to the narrative".
Regarding the action scenes, the reviewer felt that only the chariot race was staged with "any suggestion of real flamboyancy or flair" and that Canale's erotic dance before Justinian was "painfully unexciting".

See also
List of historical drama films
Late Antiquity

References

Footnotes

Sources

External links
 

1954 films
1950s Italian-language films
Films set in the Byzantine Empire
Films set in the 6th century
Films set in Istanbul
Italian biographical films
French biographical films
Peplum films
Films directed by Riccardo Freda
1950s biographical films
1950s historical films
Biographical films about Roman emperors
Cultural depictions of Justinian I
Cultural depictions of Theodora I
Lux Film films
Sword and sandal films
Films scored by Renzo Rossellini
1950s Italian films
1950s French films